Jordan Matthew Cox (born 21 October 2000) is an English professional cricketer. He signed his first professional contract with Kent County Cricket Club in October 2018, having joined the county club at age 10, played for them at age-group levels and been a member of the club's academy programme, winning the John Aitken Gray award as the best academy scholar in 2018.

Cox has played for the England under-19 cricket team, including at the 2020 under-19 World Cup. Along with Jack Leaning he set a new highest partnership for any wicket for Kent in 2020, scoring 238 not out in an unbroken partnership of 423 runs against Sussex at Canterbury.

Early life
Cox was born at Margate in Kent and educated at Wellesley House School and Felsted School. He first played for Kent's Second XI in 2017. He played for the London and East team in the ECB Super-4s developmental T20 competition in 2018 and was named player of the tournament. In early 2019 he played for the England under-19 cricket team on their tour of Bangladesh. In club cricket he plays for Sandwich Town Cricket Club in the Kent Cricket League.

Cricket career
After scoring a century in a 50-over Second XI friendly in April 2019 he made his List A cricket debut on 27 April 2019 against the touring Pakistanis, scoring 21 runs. Following a series of good batting performances, including scoring two centuries, for the Second XI during the 2019 season, Cox made his first-class cricket debut in July against Hampshire and was called into the England under-19 squad for a series of matches against India and Bangladesh during August. He made his Twenty20 debut later the same month against Somerset in the 2019 t20 Blast.

After finishing a tri-series of matches in December 2019 against West Indies and Sri Lanka under-19s as England under-19's leading run scorer, Cox was named in England's squad for the 2020 Under-19 Cricket World Cup in South Africa the following month.

In August 2020, Cox scored his maiden century in first-class cricket against Sussex at Canterbury in the second round of matches of the 2020 Bob Willis Trophy. Cox went on to finish the innings unbeaten on 238 in a Kent record partnership for any wicket of 423 runs with Jack Leaning. Cox's century was the first scored in England by a player born in the 2000s. Cox was subsequently dropped for Kent's next match after having posed for photographs with young fans of the club, a breach of club medical protocols put in place during the COVID-19 pandemic. Later in the year Cox signed a contract extension with Kent, extending his contract until the end of the 2023 season.

During the 2021 season, Cox was named Player of the Match as Kent won the 2021 T20 Blast final. He scored 58 not out from 28 balls in the final and his "incredible piece of fielding gymnastics" helped take the wicket of Somerset batsman Lewis Gregory, Cox palming the ball back from beyond the boundary to teammate Matt Milnes who was able to take the catch. He was part of the Oval Invincibles squad for the 2021 season of The Hundred, having been selected in the Wildcard Draft in the run up to the start of the competition. Although he did not play a match for the side during the season, he was retained for the 2022 season. Cox holds an Australian passport and over the 2021/22 English off-season he played Sydney Grade Cricket for Mosman Cricket Club, having played for Estern Suburbs the previous season. In December 2021 he was recruited by Big Bash League side Hobart Hurricanes as a replacement for the opening match of their 2021/22 season. In September 2022, Cox was one of five uncapped players named in the England squad for their seven-match Twenty20 International tour of Pakistan later in the same month.

Notes

References

External links
 

2000 births
Living people
English cricketers
Kent cricketers
English cricketers of the 21st century
Oval Invincibles cricketers
Hobart Hurricanes cricketers